Catholic Kwandong University (가톨릭관동대학교) is a South Korean university located in Gangneung, Gangwon-do. The university was established in 1954.

The Kwandong Hockey Centre is on its grounds.

Notable people

Xiumin (Exo)
Park Gwang-hyun

External links 
 Catholic Kwandong University website 

Buildings and structures in Gangneung
Catholic universities and colleges in South Korea
Universities and colleges in Gangwon Province, South Korea
Educational institutions established in 1955
1955 establishments in South Korea